The 2013–14 LEB Oro season was the 18th season of the Liga Española de Baloncesto, a Spanish basketball league. It was named Adecco Oro as its sponsored identity. The champion of the regular season, River Andorra MoraBanc was promoted to Liga ACB. The teams between second and ninth position joined the promotion play off, where the winner, Ford Burgos was promoted too to the higher division.

Competition format

Regular season
The regular season was played by round-robin system.

After the first leg of the season, the two top qualified teams played the Copa Príncipe de Asturias and the leader will be the host team.

At the final of the season:
The regular season winner promoted directly to Liga ACB.
Teams qualified between 2nd and 9th, joined the promotion play-offs to ACB.
Teams qualified in positions 12th and 13th would play the relegation playoffs.
Team qualified in last position is relegated directly to LEB Plata.

On November 7, after five games played, the Spanish Basketball Federation, in agreement with the clubs of the league, decided to change the competition format:

Teams in positions 13th and 14th would be relegated directly, instead the relegation playoffs between 12th and 13th
Quarterfinals were reduced to a best-of-three games format.

Team information and location

New teams in the league
Unión Financiera Baloncesto Oviedo (champion of LEB Plata)
Clínicas Rincón (achieved a vacant berth in the league)

Teams that left the league
Lucentum Alicante (will play in 1ª División, fifth tier)
Cáceres Patrimonio de la Humanidad (registered in LEB Plata)

Also, CB Atapuerca was dissolved and substituted by CB Tizona. It will have the same sponsorship name: Ford Burgos.

Managerial changes during the season

Regular season

League table

|}
(C): indicates Copa Príncipe champion.

Results

Copa Príncipe de Asturias
At the half of the league, the two first teams in the table play the Copa Príncipe de Asturias at home of the winner of the first half season (13th round). If this team doesn't want to host the Copa Príncipe, the second qualified can do it. If nobody wants to host it, the Federation will propose a neutral venue.

The Champion of this Cup will play the play-offs as first qualified if it finishes the league between the 2nd and the 5th qualified. The Copa Príncipe will be played on January 31, 2014.

Teams qualified

|}

The game

Playoffs

Final standings

Stats leaders in regular season

Points

Rebounds

Assists

Performance Index Rating

Awards and trophies

All LEB Oro team
The all LEB Oro team was selected after the end of the regular season.
 Fran Cárdenas (Unión Financiera Baloncesto Oviedo)
 Marius Grigonis (Peñas Huesca)
 Marc Blanch (River Andorra MoraBanc)
 Pep Ortega (Ford Burgos)
 Jordi Trias (River Andorra MoraBanc)

MVP of the regular season
 Jordi Trias (River Andorra MoraBanc)

Coach of the season
 Joan Peñarroya (River Andorra MoraBanc)

MVP week by week

See also
2013–14 ACB season
2013–14 LEB Plata season

References

External links
Official website
LEB Oro page in the FEB website

 
LEB Oro seasons

LEB2
Spain
Second level Spanish basketball league seasons